Booker T. Bradshaw (May 21, 1940– April 1, 2003), born in Richmond, Virginia, was an American record producer, film and TV actor, and Motown executive.

Early life
Bradshaw worked for his father, Booker T. Bradshaw Sr., president of Virginia Mutual Life Insurance Company; a former member of the Richmond School Board and a trustee of Virginia Union and Virginia State. Bradshaw, disillusioned and working at his father's life insurance company, went on to study at Harvard to earn a degree in English.  There he honed his acting skills, and met folk singer/musician Joan Baez.  In 1961, while a junior at Harvard, he applied his singing talents on The Original Amateur Hour television show with Ted Mack as a singer of folk songs, becoming a three-time winner, and participated in the national finals at Madison Square Garden.  He graduated from Harvard in 1962 and had learned to speak three languages. Bradshaw then went on to play at Carnegie Hall, and in the early sixties he was given a full scholarship to study at the Royal Academy of Dramatic Art in London, England.

Career
Bradshaw joined Motown Records in Detroit, Michigan and became their International Manager. He was in charge of The Supremes and The Temptations on their European tours. He ventured back to acting with John Ferald, school principal of The Royal Academy at the time, doing repertory work at Oakland University outside of Detroit.

Among his many television and movie roles, he was cast as Dr. M'Benga in two episodes of the original Star Trek series. He also acted in The Mod Squad, Bracken's World, and The F.B.I. TV series and the 1973 blaxploitation film Coffy.  He was also an accomplished writer and wrote material for TV Shows such as Planet Of The Apes, Get Christie Love! and Columbo.

Death
Bradshaw died from a heart attack in Los Angeles, California,  on April 1, 2003, a month before his 63rd birthday. Bradshaw is survived by daughter Alaiyo Bradshaw.

Filmography

Film

Television

References

External links

1940 births
2003 deaths
African-American male actors
American male film actors
American male television actors
Harvard University alumni
Alumni of RADA
20th-century American male actors
20th-century African-American people
21st-century African-American people